Rhys Breen (born 6 January 2000) is a Scottish footballer who plays as a defender for Dunfermline Athletic. Breen began his career with Rangers, and has also had loan spells with Partick Thistle, Queen of the South and Orange County SC. Breen joined Dunfermline athletic in July 2021.

Career
In November 2019, Breen, a product of the Rangers youth system, signed a new contract with the club extending his stay until the summer of 2021. On 27 August 2020, Breen joined Scottish League One club Partick Thistle on loan until the end of the season.

Breen was recalled from Thistle at the beginning of 2021 and on 7 January 2021, joined Scottish Championship side Queen of the South on loan for the remainder of the season. Breen made his debut for the club in a win against Greenock Morton.

Breen moved on loan to Rangers' USL Championship affiliate club Orange County SC on 14 May 2021. After 3 months in America, Breen returned home to Scotland to sign a two-year contract with Scottish Championship club Dunfermline Athletic.

References

External links

2000 births
Living people
Scottish footballers
Association football defenders
Rangers F.C. players
Partick Thistle F.C. players
Queen of the South F.C. players
Orange County SC players
Dunfermline Athletic F.C. players
Scottish Professional Football League players
USL Championship players
Scottish expatriate footballers
Scottish expatriate sportspeople in the United States
Expatriate soccer players in the United States